Natalia Vdovina (born 23 October 1976) is a retired Russian female volleyball player.

She was part of the Russia women's national volleyball team at the 2004 FIVB World Grand Prix.

Clubs 
 Besiktas Istanbul
 VC Dynamo-Yantar Kaliningrad 
 VK Uralochka

References

External links 
 FIVB profile
 CEV profile
 http://www.fivb.org/EN/volleyball/competitions/WorldGrandPrix/2004/Photos/PhotoGallery.asp?No=041&Title=Russia%20vs%20Thailand
 http://www.fivb.org/EN/volleyball/competitions/WorldGrandPrix/2004/Photos/PhotoGallery.asp?No=015&Title=Russia%20vs%20Italy

1976 births
Living people
Russian women's volleyball players
Place of birth missing (living people)